Razan is a city and capital of Razan County, Hamadan Province, Iran. At the 2006 census, its population was 15,371.

Language 
Linguistic composition of the city.

References

Populated places in Razan County
Cities in Hamadan Province